Effectiveness is the extent to which a goal is achieved (has an effect).

Effectiveness, effectivity, effect or effective can refer to:

Effectiveness:
 Aid effectiveness, the degree of success or failure of international aid
 Battle Effectiveness Award, a U.S. annual award
 Combat effectiveness, the capacity or performance of a military force to succeed in undertaking an operation, mission or objective
 Condom effectiveness, how effective condoms are at preventing STDs and pregnancy
 Cost-effectiveness analysis, a form of economic analysis that compares the relative costs and outcomes (effects) of different courses of action
 Center for Regulatory Effectiveness, a U.S. industry-funded for-profit think tank
 Effectiveness of torture
 Efficacy, clinical effectiveness, often dinstincted from effectiveness in medical usage
 Government effectiveness index, an index elaborated by the World Bank Group
 Loss of tail-rotor effectiveness, when the tail rotor of a helicopter is exposed to wind forces that prevent it from carrying out its function
 Organizational effectiveness, a concept organizations use to gauge how effective they are at reaching intended outcomes
 Overall equipment effectiveness, a measure of how well a manufacturing operation is utilized
 Overall labor effectiveness, a key performance indicator (KPI) that measures the utilization, performance, and quality of the workforce
 Power usage effectiveness, a ratio that describes how efficiently a computer data center uses energy
 Relative biological effectiveness, the ratio of biological effectiveness of one type of ionizing radiation relative to another, given the same amount of absorbed energy
 Sales effectiveness, the ability of a company's sales professionals to win at each stage of the customer's buying process
 Team effectiveness or group effectiveness, the capacity a team has to accomplish the goals or objectives
 The Unreasonable Effectiveness of Mathematics in the Natural Sciences, a 1960 article by the physicist Eugene Wigner
 Water usage effectiveness, a sustainability metric created by The Green Grid in 2011 to attempt to measure the amount of water used by datacenters

Effectivity:
 Effectivity satellite in data vault modelling, a satellite built on a link, which records the time period when the corresponding link records start and end effectivity

Effect:
 Effect (disambiguation)
 List of effects

Effective:
 Effective altruism, a socio-economic mindset using evidence to determine the most effective ways to benefit others
 Effective interest rate, a precisely defined interest rate
 Effective temperature, temperature of a black body that would emit the same total amount of electromagnetic radiation
 Effective mass (solid-state physics), a property of an excitation in a crystal analogous to the mass of a free particle
 Effective mass (spring–mass system), a parameter in physics problems
 Effective method or effective procedure, a procedure for solving a problem by any intuitively 'effective' means from a specific class
 Effective action, a term in quantum field theory
 Effective demand in economics, a type of market is the demand for a product or service
 Effective microorganism, various blends of common predominantly anaerobic microorganisms
 Effective power (electricity), also known as active power or real power, a concept in AC power
 Effective power (mechanical), a measurement of horsepower
 The 7 Habits of Highly Effective People, a 1989 business and self-help book
 Effective stress in soil mechanics
 Effective topos in mathematics, a topos that captures the idea of effectivity in mathematics
 Effective dose
 Effective dose (pharmacology), a dose or concentration of a drug that produces a biological response
 Effective dose (radiation), a measure of the stochastic effect on health risk that a radiation dose internal or external to whole or part of the body will have
 In toxicology, the internal dose measured through biomonitoring
 Effective torque, often referred to as wheel torque, measurement associated with automotive performance
 Effective porosity in hydrology, commonly representing the porosity of a rock or sediment available to contribute to fluid flow through the rock
 Effective theory, a type of scientific theory
 Effective date or as of date, the date upon which something is considered to take or have taken effect
 Effective transmission rate, average rate of information transmission
 Effective Cycling, a trademarked cycling educational program designed
 Effective frequency in advertising, the number of times a person must be exposed to an advertising message before a response is made
 Effective potential or effective potential energy, combination of multiple and perhaps opposing effects into a single potential

See also 
 Effect (disambiguation)
 Efficiency (disambiguation)
 Energy efficiency (disambiguation)